The 2016–17 Dutch Basketball League was the 57th season of the Dutch Basketball League, the highest professional basketball league in the Netherlands. The season started on October 8, 2016 and ended May 25, 2017. Donar successfully defended its title.

Teams

Den Bosch and BSW were both close to bankruptcy in the offseason, but managed to stay alive. Challenge Sports Rotterdam changed its name to Forward Lease Rotterdam, after they got a new main sponsor. On November 1, Den Bosch changed its name to New Heroes.

Foreign players
The number of foreign players during the 2016–17 season was restricted to four per DBL team.

Regular season
The Regular season started on 8 October 2016 and finished 8 April 2017.

Standings

Play-offs
The play-offs started on April 15 and ended on May 28, 2017. In the quarterfinals a best-of-three format is used, while in the semifinals and finals in a best-of-seven format.

Source: DBL

Final standings
The final standings are based upon performance in the playoffs.

Awards

Most Valuable Player

Play-offs MVP

All-DBL Team

MVP Under 23

Sixth Man of the Year

Most Improved Player

Defensive Player of the Year

Rookie of the Year

Sixth Man of the Year

DBL All-Defense Team

DBL All-Rookie Team

Coach of the Year

References

Dutch Basketball League seasons
1
Netherlands